Aleksandr Ivannikov (born 23 January 1945 in Moscow) is a Soviet ski jumper who competed from 1963 to 1972. He finished sixth in the individual large hill event at the 1964 Winter Olympics in Innsbruck.

Ivannikov's best career finish was second in an individual normal hill event in Austria in 1964.

External links

1945 births
Living people
Ski jumpers at the 1964 Winter Olympics
Soviet male ski jumpers
Skiers from Moscow
Olympic ski jumpers of the Soviet Union
20th-century Russian people